Chitose Station is the name of three train stations in Japan:

 Chitose Station (Aomori) (千年駅)
 Chitose Station (Chiba) (千歳駅)
 Chitose Station (Hokkaido) (千歳駅)